The 1938 Irish general election to the 10th Dáil was held on Friday, 17 June following the dissolution of the 9th Dáil on 27 May 1938 by the Presidential Commission on the request of Taoiseach Éamon de Valera. It was a snap election, less than a year after the previous election, the proximate cause being the government's loss of an opposition motion recommending use of arbitration to resolve Civil Service labour disputes. The general election took place in 34 parliamentary constituencies throughout Ireland for 138 seats in Dáil Éireann. It was the first election held after the adoption of the Constitution of Ireland on 29 December 1937. Fianna Fáil won the first overall majority in the history of the State.

The 10th Dáil met at Leinster House on 30 June to nominate the Taoiseach for appointment by President Douglas Hyde and to approve the appointment of a new government of Ireland on the nomination of the Taoiseach. Outgoing Taoiseach Éamon de Valera was re-appointed leading a single-party Fianna Fáil government.

Result

|}

Voting summary

Seats summary

Government formation
Fianna Fáil formed a majority government, the 2nd Government of Ireland.

First time TDs
Erskine H. Childers
Daniel Hogan
James Hughes
Frank Loughman
Henry McDevitt
Thomas Mullen
Peter O'Loghlen
Mícheál Ó Móráin

Re-elected TDs
William Broderick
Eamonn Cooney
Richard Mulcahy
James Reidy

Outgoing TDs
Archie Heron (Lost seat)
Gerrard McGowan (Retired)
Edward Moane (Lost seat)
Sydney Minch (Lost seat)
Daniel O'Leary (Lost seat)

Notes

References

General election, 1938
1938
10th Dáil
June 1938 events
General election